Pavel Němčický (born 13 August 1977) is a Czech former football player.

Němčický spent almost his whole Gambrinus liga career with 1. FC Slovácko, where he played since 1999. After the 2009-2010 season, the club decided to not extend his contract, and Němčický decided to end his professional career in July 2010.

References

External links
 
 
 Profile at 1. FC Slovácko website 

1977 births
Living people
Czech footballers
Czech Republic under-21 international footballers
Czech First League players
FC Slovan Liberec players
1. FC Slovácko players
Association football defenders
People from Uherské Hradiště
Sportspeople from the Zlín Region